Bencoolen Street is a street in Central, Singapore that starts at the junction of Rochor Road, Rochor Canal Road and Jalan Besar and ends at the junction of Fort Canning Road, Stamford Road and Orchard Road. The street houses several landmarks including Sim Lim Square, Bencoolen Mosque and Albert Complex. A number of hotels and serviced apartments exist, namely Summer View Hotel, Bayview Hotel Singapore, Hotel 81 Bencoolen, Strand Hotel, Rendezvous Hotel and Somerset Bencoolen. It is accessible via Bencoolen MRT station which is located under Bencoolen Street itself.

References
Victor R Savage, Brenda S A Yeoh (2004), Toponymics A Study of Singapore Street Names, Eastern University Press, ''

Roads in Singapore
Museum Planning Area
Rochor